Jefferson Darío Lara Acosta (born February 20, 1990 in Ibarra) is an Ecuadorian football defender playing for Anaconda FC.

Club career
A product of LDU Quito's youth system, he played at both the senior and youth levels of the club. He became part of the senior squad in 2007, but didn't earn his first senior cap until 2008. In 2010, he was loaned to Serie B squad UT Cotapaxi to gain professional experience.

References

External links
FEF card  

Jefferson Lara at Footballdatabase

1990 births
Living people
People from Ibarra, Ecuador
Association football defenders
Ecuadorian footballers
L.D.U. Quito footballers
S.D. Aucas footballers
Deportivo Azogues footballers
Imbabura S.C. footballers
Delfín S.C. footballers
Manta F.C. footballers
21st-century Ecuadorian people